Courthouse in Września is a three-storey building in gdańsk renaissance style built in 1906.

Architecture
Three-storey, covered with a high pitched roof with wide exhibitions roof. Elevation in the party plinth Facing granite. The windows and corners are framed sandstone. Four-elevations of the building is crowned by high peaks. The main entrance is placed asymmetrically profiled covered by a decorative finial portal (including the eagle).

Location
It is located on ul. John Paul II 10. Now there is The District Court of Środza Wielkopolska placed in Września.

Departments
II Probation Service Judicial District of Środa Wielkopolska Court based in Września

VI Faculty of Civil headquartered in Września

VII Zmiejscowy Criminal Division based in Września

VIII Faculty of Family and Juvenile headquartered in Września

IX Faculty of Land Registry based in Września

Gallery

Bibliography
 https://web.archive.org/web/20140407091902/http://www.srodawlkp.sr.gov.pl/strony/1/pl/0.php

Września
Buildings and structures in Greater Poland Voivodeship
Courthouses
Government buildings completed in 1906
1906 establishments in Germany